Party of Democratic Prosperity was a political party in Montenegro.

History
It the legislative elections in Montenegro held on 10 September 2006, PDP won together with the Democratic League in Montenegro 1 out of 81 seats.

Albanian political parties in Montenegro